Wilhelm Schäfer (20 January 1868 – 19 January 1952) was a German writer.

Life 

Born in Ottrau (Hesse), until 1896 Schäfer was a school teacher. He gained a scholarship to study in Switzerland and France through the Cotta-Verlag publishing house, and in 1898 became a freelance writer in Berlin. He lived in Vallendar from 1900 to 1915, and from 1918 until his death in 1952, he lived in Bodman on the Bodensee.

His work (drama, novels, and short prose pieces) were naturalist in style and marked with "völkisch" and national elements. In 1930 he published a novel about the shoe-maker Wilhelm Voigt with the title Der Hauptmann von Köpenick.

From 1900 to 1920, he published the magazine Die Rheinlande. His early work was especially influenced by naturalism. Important novellas were "Die unterbrochene Rheinfahrt" (1913) und "Hölderlins Einkehr" (1925). Schäfer's folksy language and mystification of the "German soul" made his work popular with the Nazis.

Awards 

 1941 Goethepreis der Stadt Frankfurt
 1948 Honorary citizen of Bodman

Works (selection) 

 Die zehn Gebote. Erzählungen des Kanzelfriedrich, 1897
 Rheinsagen, 1908
 Karl Stauffers Lebensgang. Eine Chronik der Leidenschaft, 1912
 Das fremde Fräulein (Novelle über den Tod der Idilia Dubb auf Burg Lahneck)
 Die dreizehn Bücher der deutschen Seele, 1922
 Winckelmanns Ende, 1925
 Der Hauptmann von Köpenick, 1930
 Mein Leben, 1934
 Theoderich, König des Abendlandes, 1939
 Lebenstag eines Menschenfreundes (Ein Pestalozzi Roman), 1915

References 

 Sabine Brenner: "Wir ungereimten Rheinländer wollen es wieder richtig machen". Wilhelm Schäfer und die Kulturzeitschrift "Die Rheinlande". In: "Ganges Europas, heiliger Strom!" Der literarische Rhein (1900-1933), hrsg. v. Sabine Brenner. Düsseldorf 2001. (= Veröffentlichungen des Heinrich-Heine-Instituts Düsseldorf). S. 47-74. 
 Mechthild Curtius: Über die Möglichkeiten und Schwierigkeiten, sich einem Heimatdichter filmisch zu nähern. Essay über den rheinischen Schriftsteller Wilhelm Schäfer. In: Literatur in Westfalen.  7 (2004) S. 397-412.
 Conrad Höfer: Wilhelm Schäfer. Bibliographie. Berlin: Privatdr. bei Steinkopf 1937-1943.
 Hans Lorenzen: Typen deutscher Anekdotenerzählung (Kleist - Hebel - Schäfer). Hamburg: Univ. Diss. 1935.
 Maik Irmisch: Kapitel "Greither und Wilhelm Schäfer" in "Aloys Greither - Hautarzt zwischen Mozart, Hesse, Dix und Scharl" Norderstedt: Books on Demand, 2006 
 Wilhelm Schäfer. Zu seinem 50. Geburtstag, hrsg. v. Karl Röttger. München: Müller 1918.
 Bekenntnis zu Wilhelm Schäfer. Zum 60. Geburtstag des Dichters am 20. Januar 1928, hrsg. v. Otto Doderer. München: Müller 1928.
 Franz Stuckert: Wilhelm Schäfer. Ein Volksdichter unserer Zeit. München: Langen/Müller 1935.

1868 births
1952 deaths

People from Schwalm-Eder-Kreis
German male writers